Joseph-Célestin Nadon (January 11, 1899 – December 17, 1953) was a Canadian provincial and federal politician.

He entered politics as a municipal councillor in Maniwaki from 1928 to 1934 and was mayor from 1935 to 1939. In 1939, he was elected to the Legislative Assembly of Quebec for the riding of Gatineau. A Liberal, he was re-elected in 1944 and was defeated in 1948. In a 1949 by-election, he was elected to the House of Commons of Canada for the riding of Gatineau. A Liberal, he was re-elected in 1953 and died shortly after in December.

References
 
 

1899 births
1953 deaths
Liberal Party of Canada MPs
Mayors of places in Quebec
Members of the House of Commons of Canada from Quebec
People from Maniwaki
Quebec Liberal Party MNAs